Mount Thompson-Seton is a summit in the U.S. state of Montana.

Mount Thompson-Seton was named after Ernest Thompson Seton (1860–1946), the Canadian-American scouting pioneer and author, who had paid the area a visit.

References

Landforms of Flathead County, Montana
Thompson-Seton